Michael Rösch (born May 4, 1983) is a German and Belgian (since 2014) former biathlete.

Life and career
He is the son of the former biathlete Eberhard Rösch. He was junior world champion four times, three times in the relay and once in the sprint distance in 2003. On 16 December 2005 Rösch took his first official world cup podium with a second in the 10 km sprint, and on 15 January 2006 he won his first world cup victory in Ruhpolding when he beat Raphaël Poirée. In 2006, he won an Olympic gold medal with the German team in the relay. In addition, Rösch finished fifth in the overall standings in the 2005–06 Biathlon World Cup. He also took three World Championship bronze medals in relays and two race wins in the Biathlon World Cup.

However, in subsequent years Rösch suffered a dip in form, which led to him not being selected for the 2010 Winter Olympics. The decline in Rösch's results saw him being dropped by the German Ski Association (DSV) from international competition, both from the World Cup and the second-tier IBU Cup. When his improved performances saw him set to be picked for the 2012 Biathlon World Championships, the DSV did not select him, escalating disputes between himself and the Association and eventually leading him to switch nationalities and apply for Belgian citizenship. However, Rösch's naturalisation was not completed until January 2014, leaving him without enough time to qualify for  the 2014 Winter Olympics. During this period, in order to rebuild his sporting career, he resigned from his position in the police force in Germany, and moved back in with his parents.

Whilst competing for Belgium, Rösch initially trained with Alexander Os and Lars Berger, who had similarly been dropped by the Norwegian Biathlon Association, in a training group they humorously nicknamed the "Feskslog" - Norwegian for "fish waste". He later switched to training with the Swiss biathlon squad. He made his debut for Belgium at an IBU Cup meeting in Martell, Italy in March 2014, taking two top 20 finishes in the sprint and pursuit there. These performances earned him a wild card for the 2014-15 World Cup season. After switching countries, in August 2014 he became the first Belgian biathlete to win a global title when he took the gold medal in the pursuit at the Summer Biathlon World Championships in Tyumen, Russia, having already taken a silver in the sprint the previous day. Rösch also led the first Belgian World Cup relay team. In December 2016, he finished sixth in the pursuit at the Pokljuka World Cup meeting - his first top ten World Cup finish in solo competition since 2009: Rösch subsequently said that this result was "a bigger success than the Olympic gold medal. There was a lot more in it after all the setbacks". In a tearful interview by the finish line, he dedicated the result to his late former coach, Klaus Siebert. He also became the first Belgian to take a podium in the top two tiers of biathlon competition when he finished second in an IBU Cup race.

In 2018, he competed at his second Olympics, twelve years after his first, after crowdfunding the equivalent of over US$28,500 to enable him to do so. He finished in 23rd position in the pursuit, 38th in the sprint and 75th in the individual. In January 2019, at the Oberhof World Cup meeting, Rösch announced that he would retire from competition after the next weekend's following World Cup round in Ruhpolding, explaining that he felt it was the right time to retire as he was expecting to become a father for the first time, with his girlfriend being due to give birth in March.

Biathlon results
All results are sourced from the International Biathlon Union.

Olympic Games
1 medals (1 gold)

World Championships
3 medals (3 bronze)

*During Olympic seasons competitions are only held for those events not included in the Olympic program.
**In 2005 the mixed relay, contested for the first time in the World Championships, was held in Khanty-Mansiysk, Russia.

Individual victories
2 victories (1 Sp, 1 Pu)

*Results are from UIPMB and IBU races which include the Biathlon World Cup, Biathlon World Championships and the Winter Olympic Games.

References

External links
Official homepage of Michael Rösch

1983 births
German male biathletes
Living people
Olympic biathletes of Germany
Olympic biathletes of Belgium
Biathletes at the 2006 Winter Olympics
Biathletes at the 2018 Winter Olympics
Olympic gold medalists for Germany
Olympic medalists in biathlon
Biathlon World Championships medalists
Medalists at the 2006 Winter Olympics
Belgian male biathletes
Naturalised citizens of Belgium
People from Pirna
Sportspeople from Saxony
People from Bezirk Dresden